The 2018 FIBA Women's Basketball World Cup Final was a basketball game which took place on 30 September 2018 at Tenerife Sports Pavilion Santiago Martin in San Cristóbal de La Laguna, Spain, to determine the winner of the 2018 FIBA Women's Basketball World Cup.

Their last game against each other at World Cup level came in 2014, with the United States taking an 82–70 victory.

Team USA won again, this time 73–56, to win their third straight and tenth overall title.

Road to the final

Australia
Australia qualified by finishing second in the 2017 FIBA Asia Women's Cup.

United States
The Americans qualified by virtue of being the defending Olympic champions, after defeating  in the 2016 gold medal game.

Match details
This was the eleventh meeting between Australia and the United States in the World Cup, with the USA leading the head-to-head 10–0. It was the first meeting between the two in a World Cup final.

The teams entered the game with an even deeper familiarity with one another due to extensive WNBA connections, which went beyond the fact that many USA and Australian players had played in the league's 2018 season. At match time, Australia head coach Sandy Brondello was also head coach of the Phoenix Mercury, then home to Australia's Stephanie Talbot and Americans Brittney Griner and Diana Taurasi. Rebecca Allen (Australia) and Tina Charles (USA) were New York Liberty teammates in that season. Five individuals who played significant roles in the Seattle Storm's victory in the 2018 WNBA Finals were involved in this game—American players Sue Bird, Jewell Loyd, and Breanna Stewart, Australian player Sami Whitcomb, and Storm head coach and USA assistant Dan Hughes.

*– Starters

References

Final
2014 FIBA Basketball World Cup Final
2014 FIBA Basketball World Cup Final
2018 FIBA Women's Basketball World Cup Final
Australia–United States relations
World
World